Novosibirsk State Pedagogical University (NSPU; , abbreviated ФГБОУ ВО «НГПУ») is a coeducational and public research university located in Novosibirsk, Russia. It is the largest pedagogical university in Siberia and the Far East, with 13,500 students (FTEs) as of 2020. The current rector of the university is Gerasyov Alexey Dmitrievich. The university cooperates with 64 educational institutions in 22 countries.

Between 1941 and 1943 the university moved to Kolpashevo, Tomsk Oblast. Since 2011, the university has published Science for Education Today, formerly the Novosibirsk State Pedagogical University Вulletin, a  peer-reviewed research periodical. 

As a result of the COVID-19 pandemic, the university has switched to remote instruction for all students except for first- and second- year undergraduates and students in program including laboratory and practical classes that require special conditions.

References

External links
Official website

Universities and institutes established in the Soviet Union
Education in Novosibirsk
Universities in Novosibirsk Oblast
Teachers colleges in Russia
1935 establishments in Russia
Educational institutions established in 1935
Buildings and structures in Novosibirsk